The 2011 Gardner–Webb Runnin' Bulldogs football team represented Gardner–Webb University in the 2011 NCAA Division I FCS football season. The Runnin' Bulldogs were led by first-year head coach Ron Dickerson, Jr. and played their home games at Ernest W. Spangler Stadium. They are a member of the Big South Conference. They finished the season 4–7, 2–4 in Big South play to finish in a tie for fifth place.

Schedule

References

Gardner-Webb
Gardner–Webb Runnin' Bulldogs football seasons
Gardner-Webb Runnin' Bulldogs f